Jim Carstairs (31 August 1929 – 7 July 1996) was  a former Australian rules footballer who played with Essendon in the Victorian Football League (VFL).

Notes

External links 		
		
Jim Carstairs's profile at Australianfootball.com		
		
		
		
		
		
1929 births		
1996 deaths		
Australian rules footballers from Victoria (Australia)		
Essendon Football Club players